In Virgil's Aeneid, Androgeos or Androgeus (derived from andros "of a man" and geos, genitive gē "earth, land") was a Greek soldier, who during the sack of Troy in the middle of the night mistook Aeneas and his group of Trojan defenders for a Greek raiding party, paying for this mistake with his life. Afterwards, Aeneas's companion Coroebus dressed in Androgeos's armor in order to fool more Greek soldiers to their demise, only to be the first among Aeneas's disguised group to die.

See also 

 List of Trojan asteroids (Greek camp)

Note 

Achaeans (Homer)
Characters in the Aeneid

References 

 Publius Vergilius Maro, Aeneid. Theodore C. Williams. trans. Boston. Houghton Mifflin Co. 1910. Online version at the Perseus Digital Library.
 Publius Vergilius Maro, Bucolics, Aeneid, and Georgics. J. B. Greenough. Boston. Ginn & Co. 1900. Latin text available at the Perseus Digital Library.